In the field of transport a fly is, by definition, a vehicle that moves quickly. Examples include a light horse-drawn  public passenger vehicle or delivery wagon or a light, covered, vehicle hired from a livery stable (such as a single-horse pleasure carriage or a hansom cab).

See also 
 Types of carriages

References

Carriages